Los Parientes Pobres (Poor Relatives) is a Mexican telenovela produced by Carla Estrada for Televisa in 1993. Lucero sang the main theme and it was an airplay hit in all Latin America. It was never released as a single, but it appears in the special album Lazos de Amor and her Lucero album known as Veleta.

Lucero and Ernesto Laguardia starred as protagonists and Co-starring Nuria Bages and Joaquín Cordero, while Alexis Ayala, Chantal Andere, Humberto Elizondo, Maribel Fernández, Delia Casanova, Ana Patricia Rojo and the leading actress Bertha Moss starred as antagonists.

Co-protagonizada por Nuria Bages y Joaquín Cordero

Plot
Two families, the Santos and the Olmos, face a fight of power, ambitions, selfishness and love. The Santos are provincial family that has a pottery factory with financial problems, which Ramiro Santos (Rogelio Guerra) manages along with his cousin Evaristo Olmos (Joaquín Cordero). However, this business deal finishes due to personal differences, this provokes the rancor and hate of Ramiro, and his family goes into bankruptcy, while Evaristo Olmos achieves an excellent status.

When Ramiro dies, his family moves to the capital, hoping for a good fortune. But destiny will set a trap, when Evaristo offers his house for them to live, here his family treat them very bad, with contempt and haughtiness because they are the poor relatives.

Cast 
 
Lucero as Margarita Santos
Ernesto Laguardia as Jesús "Chucho" Sánchez
Chantal Andere as Alba Zavala
Alexis Ayala as Bernardo Ávila
Nuria Bages as María Inés de Santos
Joaquín Cordero as Evaristo Olmos
Humberto Elizondo as Paulino Zavala
Rogelio Guerra as Ramiro Santos
Delia Casanova as Eloísa de Olmos
Fernando Casanova as Ricardo de Olmos
Ana Patricia Rojo as Griselda Olmos
Claudia Ramírez as Juliana Santos
Maribel Fernández as Amalia de Zavala
Luis Gimeno as Marlon
Eduardo López Rojas as Father Cayetano
Bertha Moss as Aunt Brígida
Guillermo Aguilar as Dr. Samuel Gómez
Ernesto Godoy as Silverio Santos
Alejandro Tommasi as Cristóbal
Socorro Avelar as Toñita
Rosario Zúñiga as Francisca Olmos
Esteban Soberanes as Gabriel Olmos
José María Torre as Luisito Santos
Estela Barona as Alondra
Patricia Martínez as Rosa
Guy de Saint Cyr as Jean Paul Dominique
Pituka de Foronda as Magdalena
Oscar Servín as Francois
Fabiola Campomanes as Elda
Patricia Navidad as Esmeralda
Consuelo Duval as Celina
Susana Lozano as Pilar
Paola Otero as Bertha
Lorenzo de Rodas as Roque del Toro
José Luis Castañeda  as Erasmo
María Luisa Coronel as Petrita
Isabel Cortázar as Sandra
Marco de Joss as Marco
Carlos Osiris as Vago
Rafael de Quevedo as Genaro
Fernando Lavín as Chencho
Sara Luz as Patricia
Pedro Luévano as Manuel
Pedro Morante as Don José
Genoveva Pérez as Clementina
Ivette Reyna as Flora
Guillermo Sauceda as Ignacio
Rafael Bazán as Pelón
Angélica Soler as Lidia
Margarita Valencia as Isidra
Isabel Martínez "La Tarabilla"
Amparo Montes
Mauricio Ferrari
Bárbara Córcega
Guadalupe Bolaños
José Antonio Ferral

Awards

References

External links

1993 telenovelas
Mexican telenovelas
1993 Mexican television series debuts
1993 Mexican television series endings
Spanish-language telenovelas
Television shows set in Mexico
Televisa telenovelas